Niphopyralis aurivillii is a moth in the grass moths family (Crambidae). It was described by Nils Victor Alarik Kemner in 1923. It is found in Indonesia (Java).

References

Moths described in 1923
Crambidae